'' is a Pakistani politicianand ex president of punjab PTI

References

2009 deaths
Balochistan MPAs 2008–2013
Politicians from Balochistan, Pakistan